Muzzle is an upcoming American thriller film directed by John Stalberg Jr. and starring Aaron Eckhart.

Cast
Aaron Eckhart as Jake Rosser
Stephen Lang
Nick Cassavetes
Diego Tinoco

Production
The film was shot in Louisville, Kentucky.  Filming wrapped in August 2022.

References

External links
 

Upcoming films
Films shot in Kentucky
Films shot in Louisville, Kentucky